Clivina vulgivaga is a species of ground beetle in the subfamily Scaritinae. It was described by Boheman in 1858.

References

vulgivaga
Beetles described in 1858